Ladiesburg is an unincorporated community in Frederick County, in the U.S. state of Maryland.

References

External links

Unincorporated communities in Frederick County, Maryland
Unincorporated communities in Maryland